S/Y Argo is a two-masted Marconi rigged schooner. She is owned and operated by Seamester Study Abroad Programs as one of three sail training vessels the company operates. Argo is certified and inspected by the British Maritime and Coastguard Agency as a Category “0” vessel, allowing her unrestricted operation in the world's oceans. She is registered in Road Town, Tortola, British Virgin Islands.

History
S/Y Argo was designed by Bill Langan as an inspiration of the schooner Black Douglas (now rechristened El Boughaz I). The motivation and backing for the project came from the success experienced by Seamester's smaller schooner Ocean Star. She was completed in June 2006 in Samut Prakan, Thailand at Marsun Shipyards.

Argo is a two-masted staysail schooner that measures  overall and accommodates twenty six students and seven professional crew on ocean voyages. Sailing under the Seamester flag, Argo circumnavigates on 90-day college semester-based programs and shorter 21-day and 60-day programs during the northern hemisphere summer.

Argo completed her first circumnavigation back to Thailand in December 2008 and was due to start her second when the piracy off of the coast of Somalia and Yemen prevented safe passage through the Gulf of Aden. 
Argo continues to circumnavigate with students aboard, taking the southerly route to Cape Town via Christmas Island and Mauritius.

Specifications

Principle equipment
Main engine: Caterpillar 3126, 
Generators: 2 × Northern Lights 25 kW
Hydraulic System: TRAC American Bow Thruster
Air Conditioning: Marine Airr
Water Maker: Sea R.O.  per day
Refrigeration: Seafrost BG 1000
Windlass: 2 × Maxwell VWC 8000
Tenders: 2 × Avon SR4.0m,  and 
Communications: Iridium Phone/Data Service, Cellular Phone, SSB, VHF

Vessel characteristics
Designer: Bill Langan
Builder: Marsun Shipyards
Length Overall (Sparred): 
Length Overall (Unsparred): 
Length On Deck: 
Beam: 
Draft: 
Displacement: 148 Tons
Height of Main Mast: 
Sail Area: .
Hull Material: Steel

See also
 List of large sailing yachts
 List of schooners

External links
 The American Sail Training Association
 Seamester Programs

References 

Individual sailing vessels
Sail training ships
Schooners
2006 ships
Ships of the British Virgin Islands
Ships built in Thailand